Antanambao Manampotsy is a village and urban commune (municipality) located in the Atsinanana region of eastern Madagascar, and is the chief town of the Antanambao Manampotsy District.

References

Cities in Madagascar
Populated places in Atsinanana